DON Market was a chain of supermarkets in the Republic of North Macedonia. Don was founded in 2007, with its first store opening at Ohrid, Macedonia. Don had its first supermarket in Ohrid and Struga but planned to open in other cities in North Macedonia. Don was the most visited supermarket in Southwest North Macedonia. It also had a chain of small shops known as Damping or Mini DON. In April of 2021, DON Market went out of business in Ohrid, Struga and Skopje.

Locations 

DON had established itself in 6 stores in:
Ohrid
Struga
Skopje

Slogans 
Supermarkets: "Biggest offer, smallest prices"

External links 
 

Supermarkets of North Macedonia